Nagendra Prasad Sarbadhikary (Bengali: নগেন্দ্র প্রসাদ সর্বাধিকারী) was an Indian football personality, known as the "Father of Indian Football" for his role in founding the first Indian football organizations after introducing the sport to his fellow classmates at Hare School, Calcutta.

Early life and family
Sarbadhikari was born on 27 August 1869 in Calcutta (now Kolkata, West Bengal), India into the renowned Sarbadhikari family originally hailing from Radhanagar (Khanakul) situated in Hooghly district. His father was Brigadier, Rai Bahadur Dr. Surya Kumar Sarbadhikari (1832–1904), a surgeon who served during the Sepoy Mutiny or Indian Rebellion of 1857 against the rule of the East India Company.

The Sarbadhikari family was founded during the early 15th century by Sureshwar Bosu of Choa ("Choa" is a village situated in Murshidabad district of present-day West Bengal), who was appointed Governor of Orissa province with the hereditary title of "Sarbadhikari" by the Imperial Court of Delhi.

He had 7 brothers and 2 sisters. Of the brothers, the names of Sir Deb Prasad Sarbadhikari who became Vice Chancellor of the University of Calcutta (1914–1918), and Suresh Prasad Sarbadhikari (1866–1921), an eminent surgeon of British India who organized the Bengal Ambulance Corps to serve in the Mesopotamia War during World War I, and managed the Carmichael Medical College & Hospital, Calcutta (now R.G. Kar Medical College & Hospital) with Dr. Radha Gobinda Kar can be mentioned.

He was married to Krishnakamalini, daughter of Ananda Krishna Deb, belonging to the Sovabazar Raj family.

Works and activities
It was Nagendra Prasad who taught the game to his classmates at the Hare School compound in 1877, after he observed British soldiers playing the game in the ground of Calcutta FC. He then convinced his friends about the game and bought a ball from Messrs Manton & Co. in Bowbazar, and was later assisted and guided by professor of the Presidency College, G. A. Stack. Thus, attracted by the enthusiasm of the boys, the European teachers of the school and adjacent colleges encouraged Nagendra Prasad and his companions to promote the game among other students in and around Calcutta. The very next day Nagendra and his friends started playing football on school premises. The Boys' Club, founded by Nagendra Prasad along with his royal friend Nagendra Mullick around this time, was the first Indian initiative to create a football organization.

Later, he formed a string of sporting clubs in Calcutta in the 1880s, one of the first being the Wellington Club in 1884. Wellington Club was formed as merger of all three of his own clubs: Boys Club, Friends Club, and Presidency Club. India's first football coach Dukhiram Majumder also played for his club. Moni Das was one of the first members to be inducted by Nagendra Prasad to the Wellington Club, but the other members of the club protested about playing with this man as he was from the lower caste. Sarbadhikary said that a sporting ground is beyond any prejudice, but after the members' continued protest, he chose to dismantle the Wellington Club. Soon after, 500 members left and Nagendra Prasad founded the Sovabazar Club in 1887, which would become one of the leading sports institutions of colonial India. The club was later patronized by both the Shobhabazar Raj and Cooch Behar State, and participated in tournaments like Trades Cup. The first member of this new club was Moni Das. Das later captained the Mohun Bagan AC, yet another legendary institution of sports in India, in colonial and post-colonial era. Sarbadhikari's close friend Kalicharan Mittir (also 'Mitra') later captained as well as became an official of Sovabazar Club. Thus a man from the lower caste, through footballing process and sport broke into the upper echelons of the Hindu society. He also founded the Howrah Sporting Club in Howrah in association with Bama Charan Kundu.

In 1892, his team Sovabazar emerged as the first Indian side to win a match against a British team, when they defeated the East Surrey Regiment with the score of 2–1 in the opening match of 1892 Trades Cup. The club thus became the first Indian team to win a match in Trades Cup. They again (then managed by Manmatha Ganguly) defeated a British side Shibpur Engineering College on 11 August 1900 at their home ground. His proposals to both the British representatives and club officials of Calcutta for arranging tournaments in organized manner, was one of the driving forces behind the foundation of Indian Football Association (IFA) in 1892. His Sovabazar Club later won Asanullah Cup in Decca in 1916, beating star-studded Mohun Bagan in final.

Sarbadhikari's contributions to the game during the age of associations in Bengal in late 19th century, influenced others like Dukhiram Majumder, Haridas Seal, Manmatha Ganguly involving in football and popularizing it among the masses.

In popular culture
A Bengali film titled Golondaaj directed by Dhrubo Banerjee and produced by Shree Venkatesh Films was released on October 10, 2021, based on the life of Nagendra Prasad Sarbadhikari, with Bengali film superstar  Dev playing the part of Sarbadhikari.

See also
Football in India
History of Indian football
Football in Kolkata

References

Further reading

Roselli, John. Self Image of Effeteness: Physical Education and Nationalism in Nineteenth Century Bengal. Past & Present (journal). 86 (February 1980). p. 121–48.
Sinha, Mrinalini. Colonial Masculinity, The Manly Englishman and the Effeminate Bengali in the Late Nineteenth Century (Manchester: Manchester University Press, 1995).

Chatterjee, Partha. The Nation and Its Fragments: Colonial and Post-colonial Histories (Calcutta: Oxford University Press, 1995).

From recreation to competition: Early history of Indian football . pp. 124–141. Published online: 6 Aug 2006. www.tandfonline.com. Retrieved 30 June 2021.

External links

 Nagendra Prasad Sarbadhikari – IFAWB (archived on 22 September 2022)
 SP Sarbadhikari by Hemotpaul Chaudhuri (archived)

 
Sport in West Bengal
Sport in Kolkata
1869 births
1940 deaths
Hare School alumni
Bengali sportspeople